Carlos Cardet (born 6 March 1951) is a Cuban former cyclist. He competed at the 1976 Summer Olympics and the 1980 Summer Olympics. In 1978, he won stage five to Karlovy Vary in the Peace Race, an important amateur race of the era.

References

External links
 

1951 births
Living people
Cuban male cyclists
Olympic cyclists of Cuba
Cyclists at the 1976 Summer Olympics
Cyclists at the 1980 Summer Olympics
Sportspeople from Havana
Pan American Games medalists in cycling
Pan American Games gold medalists for Cuba
Pan American Games bronze medalists for Cuba
Cyclists at the 1975 Pan American Games
Cyclists at the 1979 Pan American Games
Medalists at the 1975 Pan American Games
Medalists at the 1979 Pan American Games